The Shabak Militia is an armed group that formed in 2014, with around 1,500 militiamen, to regain control of the Nineveh region from the Islamic State (ISIS). Based on photographs of the group, Quwwat Sahl Ninawa was formed with the assistance of the Badr Organization.  Further goals, beyond regaining control of the region, were to protect against and oppose ISIS. The Iraqi Parliament Representative of the Shabak community, Salim Juma, obtained a verbal approval to form this militia for the purposes stated. Juma informed news sources of this move in September 2014, the group officially formed as the Quwat Sahl Nīnawā (QSN) on November 23, 2014. Videos later released by the group, however, appear to only show 500 fighters at most, though accurate estimates can not be drawn from said videos.

History
Headquartered in the Assyrian and now Shabak majority town of Bartella, the Shabak Militia (Brigade 30), is a Shabak-majority force affiliated with the Shabak Democratic Assembly but operating under the leadership of the Badr Organization. Formed in September 2014, the force is estimated to have approximately 1,500 soldiers. A former Shabak MP claimed that he obtained 'verbal approval' from the Iraqi Ministry of Defense for the creation of the force to 'fight ISIS terrorists.’ Unlike the case of the Babylon Brigades (Brigade 50), there is no doubt that the overwhelming majority of the troops are local men. In addition to their positions in Bartella and surrounding Shabak areas, Brigade 30 controls the main trade highway between Mosul and Erbil.

The Assyrian Policy Institute (API) reports that the presence of Brigade 30 in Bartella has disrupted Christian Assyrian resettlement post-ISIS. Brigade 30 has gained a reputation for perpetrating human rights abuses against local Assyrian populations. Brigade 30 soldiers have been accused of physical intimidation, rape, extortion, illegal arrests, kidnappings, and property theft. The API has recorded dozens of accounts of physical intimidation, sexual harassment, religious discrimination, robbery, and theft of land or property.  Brigade 30 soldiers are alleged to have threatened the town's primary Syriac Orthodox Church and its clergy.

Local populations fear that Brigade 30 is using the post-ISIS instability to seize a greater claim over cities like Qaraqosh (Bakhdida) and Bartella, and to advance demographic change in historically Assyrian areas. The shifting demographics in the Al-Hamdaniya District in recent decades have been a source of friction between Assyrians and Shabaks.

Sanctions
In July 2019, the United States levied sanctions against the group's leader, Waad Qado:

Waad Qado was designated for being a foreign person who is or has been a leader or official of an entity, including government entity, that has engaged in, or whose members have engaged in, serious human rights abuses relating to the leader's or official's tenure.

Qado is the leader of the 30th Brigade militia. The 30th Brigade has extracted money from the population around Bartalla, in the Ninewa Plain, through extortion, illegal arrests, and kidnappings. The 30th Brigade has frequently detained people without warrants, or with fraudulent warrants, and has charged arbitrary customs fees at its checkpoints. Members of the local population allege that the 30th Brigade has been responsible for egregious offenses including physical intimidation, extortion, robbery, kidnapping, and rape.

References

Anti-ISIL factions in Iraq
Paramilitary forces of Iraq
Popular Mobilization Forces
Shabak people
Shia Islamist groups
2014 establishments in Iraq
Axis of Resistance
Military units and formations established in 2014